Richfield is a city in Morton County, Kansas, United States.  As of the 2020 census, the population of the city was 30.

History

19th century
  
Richfield was platted in 1885 and was named for the fertility of the land.  A town was built up quickly: in less than one year, Richfield had 600 inhabitants.  In 1886, Morton County was founded and Richfield was established as the county seat.

20th century
By 1900, the population of Richfield had declined to 61.

In the 1930s, the area was further affected by its location within the Dust Bowl.  This catastrophe intensified the economic impact of the Great Depression in the region.

In 1961, the county seat was moved from Richfield to Elkhart.  Richfield has subsequently been the center for basic services for residents of the surrounding rural region: school, postal, fire and police, food and fuel.

Geography
Richfield is located at  (37.265731, -101.783654).

Climate
According to the Köppen Climate Classification system, Richfield has a semi-arid climate, abbreviated "BSk" on climate maps.

Demographics

2010 census
As of the census of 2010, there were 43 people, 20 households, and 15 families residing in the city. The racial makeup of the city was 100.0% White.

There were 20 households, of which 25.0% had children under the age of 18 living with them, 70.0% were married couples living together, 5.0% had a female householder with no husband present, and 25.0% were non-families. 25.0% of all households were made up of individuals, and 10% had someone living alone who was 65 years of age or older. The average household size was 2.15 and the average family size was 2.53.

The median age in the city was 50.5 years. 16.3% of residents were under the age of 18; 7% were between the ages of 18 and 24; 25.6% were from 25 to 44; 18.7% were from 45 to 64; and 32.6% were 65 years of age or older. The gender makeup of the city was 44.2% male and 55.8% female.

2000 census
As of the census of 2000, there were 48 people, 25 households, and 14 families residing in the city. The racial makeup of the city was 100.00% White.

There were 25 households, out of which 20.0% had children under the age of 18 living with them, 52.0% were married couples living together, 4.0% had a female householder with no husband present, and 44.0% were non-families. 40.0% of all households were made up of individuals, and 28.0% had someone living alone who was 65 years of age or older. The average household size was 1.92 and the average family size was 2.57.

In the city, the population was spread out, with 16.7% under the age of 18, 4.2% from 18 to 24, 22.9% from 25 to 44, 33.3% from 45 to 64, and 22.9% who were 65 years of age or older. The median age was 52 years. For every 100 females, there were 84.6 males. For every 100 females age 18 and over, there were 81.8 males.

The median income for a household in the city was $37,813, and the median income for a family was $42,500. Males had a median income of $33,750 versus $12,083 for females. The per capita income for the city was $16,974. There were no families and 10.3% of the population living below the poverty line, including no under eighteens and none of those over 64.

References

Further reading

External links
 Richfield - Directory of Public Officials
 USD 217, local school district
 Richfield City Map, KDOT

Cities in Kansas
Cities in Morton County, Kansas